The Pistol Nebula is located in the constellation Sagittarius. It surrounds one of the most luminous stars known, the Pistol Star. Both are located 25,000 light years away from Earth in the Quintuplet cluster, near the center of the Milky Way galaxy. The nebula contains approximately 9.3 solar masses worth of ionized gas that was ejected by the star several thousand years ago. The nebula was named in the 1980s for its shape as seen in low resolution images that were available at the time. The Pistol Star, a luminous blue variable is 1.6 million times brighter than the Sun making it one of the most luminous stars in the Milky Way.

References

External links

H II regions
Sagittarius (constellation)